Thee (Fire) is a 2009 Indian Tamil-language action film co-written, co-produced, and directed by G. Kicha. The film stars Sundar C, Namitha and Ramya Raj while Vivek, G. M. Kumar, Manoj K. Jayan, and Sayaji Shinde play supporting roles. The music was composed by Srikanth Deva, and the editing was done by Saeem. The film was released on 27 February 2009. The film was a remake of the Telugu film Operation Duryodhana.

Plot
The story begins with Sarathy (Sundar C.), a tough but honest cop. Given his straightforward nature, he is the thorn in the flesh for many antisocial elements and politicians. Due to this, he keeps getting transferred from time to time but has no qualms about it, since he is happily married to Ganga (Ramya Raj). However, Sarathy's life takes a turn when he arrests a corrupt MLA J.P. (G. M. Kumar) and his men, which leads J.P. to quit the field. J.P. vows revenge, so he kills Ganga and their two children. He also frames Sarathy in a case. Ganga escapes, and Sarathy admits her in a hospital in serious condition. This enrages Sarathy so much that he decides to take a different route. He becomes Saami, and with the help of a top hot actress Ruchi Devi (Namitha), he obtains a political ticket and successfully becomes an MLA. His wife gives birth to a child and dies in the hospital. From then on, he begins his corrupt acts in such a way that the entire society begins to loathe the police force. In no time, the police are vexed and decide to go on an indefinite strike. The entire system comes to a halt and things begin to get messy. Saami then strikes hard at J.P., and what happens from there forms the rest of the story.

Cast
 Sundar C. as ACP Sarathy/MLA Saami
 Namitha as Ruchi Devi
 Ramya Raj as Ganga
 Vivek as Rajesh
 G. M. Kumar as J.P.
 Manoj K. Jayan as ACP Jayan
 Sayaji Shinde as Rajapandiyan
 Thalaivasal Vijay as Rathnam
 Ponnambalam as Saleem
 Raj Kapoor as SI Devaraj
 Gowtham Sundararajan
 Madhan Bob as A Man who never casts vote
 Vaiyapuri as Rajapandiyan's sidekick

Soundtrack
Soundtrack was composed by Srikanth Deva.

Reception
The film received mixed reviews from critics. Behindwoods wrote "Thee has nothing new to his fans and the film is all about the clash between the politicians and police. Neither the plot of the story nor the presentation is new." Indiaglitz wrote "Thee begins brisk but doused down towards the climax. A déjà vu feeling and an influence of overdose of Telugu masala flick cannot be ruled out in the end."

References

External links
 Thee - Tamil Movie at Nanbargal.Com

2009 films
Films about the labor movement
Tamil remakes of Telugu films
2000s Tamil-language films
Fictional portrayals of the Tamil Nadu Police
Films scored by Srikanth Deva